Ceratosoma is a genus of sea slugs, dorid nudibranchs, shell-less marine gastropod mollusks in the family Chromodorididae.

Taxonomic notes
This nudibranch genus is not to be confused with the muricid gastropod genus Ceratostoma. The type species is Ceratosoma cornigerum, accepted as Ceratosoma trilobatum (J.E. Gray, 1827)

Species 
Species in the genus Ceratosoma include:
 Ceratosoma amoenum (Cheeseman, 1886)
 Ceratosoma bicolor Baba, 1949 - possibly a colour form of Ceratosoma trilobatum
 Ceratosoma brevicaudatum  Abraham, 1876 
 Ceratosoma gracillimum Semper in Bergh, 1876
 Ceratosoma ingozi  Gosliner, 1996  Inkspot nudibranch
 Ceratosoma palliolatum  Rudman, 1988 
 Ceratosoma polyomma Bergh, 1880 
 Ceratosoma pustulosum  (Cuvier, 1804) 
 Ceratosoma tenue Abraham, 1876
 Ceratosoma trilobatum (J.E. Gray, 1827) synonyms: Ceratosoma cornigerum
Species brought into synonymy
 Ceratosoma adelaidae Basedow & Hedley, 1905 accepted as Ceratosoma brevicaudatum Abraham, 1876
 Ceratosoma alleni  Gosliner, 1996  : synonym of Miamira alleni (Gosliner, 1996)
 Ceratosoma amoena [sic] accepted as Ceratosoma amoenum (Cheeseman, 1886)
 Ceratosoma berghi Rochebrune, 1895 accepted as Ceratosoma trilobatum (J.E. Gray, 1827)
 Ceratosoma bicorne Bergh, 1905 accepted as Ceratosoma tenue Abraham, 1876
 Ceratosoma caledonicum Fischer, 1876 accepted as Ceratosoma trilobatum (J.E. Gray, 1827)
 Ceratosoma corallinum Odhner, 1917 accepted as Ceratosoma trilobatum (J.E. Gray, 1827)
 Ceratosoma cornigerum (Adams & Reeve, 1850) accepted as Ceratosoma trilobatum (J.E. Gray, 1827)
 Ceratosoma flavicostatum  Baba, 1940 : synonym of Miamira flavicostata Baba, 1940
 Ceratosoma francoisi Rochebrune, 1894 accepted as Ceratosoma tenue Abraham, 1876
 Ceratosoma gibbosum Rochebrune, 1894 accepted as Ceratosoma trilobatum (J.E. Gray, 1827)
 Ceratosoma jousseaumi Rochebrune, 1894 accepted as Ceratosoma tenue Abraham, 1876
 Ceratosoma lixi Rochebrune, 1894 accepted as Ceratosoma trilobatum (J.E. Gray, 1827)
 Ceratosoma magnifica [sic] accepted as Miamira magnifica Eliot, 1904
 Ceratosoma magnificum  (Eliot, 1910)  : synonym of Miamira magnifica Eliot, 1904
 Ceratosoma miamiranum  Bergh, 1875  : synonym of Miamira miamirana (Bergh, 1875)
 Ceratosoma moloch Rudman, 1988 : synonym of Miamira moloch (Rudman, 1988)
 Ceratosoma oblongum Abraham, 1876 accepted as Ceratosoma brevicaudatum Abraham, 1876
 Ceratosoma ornatum Bergh, 1890 accepted as Ceratosoma tenue Abraham, 1876
 Ceratosoma rhopalicum Rochebrune, 1894 accepted as Ceratosoma tenue Abraham, 1876
 Ceratosoma sinuatum van Hasselt, 1824: synonym of Miamira sinuata (van Hasselt, 1824)

References

Chromodorididae
Taxa named by John Edward Gray